Jean-Louis Bauer (1 June 1952 – 30 September 2022) was a French actor and playwright.

Biography
He also wrote plays for France Inter and France Culture. In particular, he wrote the play L'Affaire with Philippe Adrien, as well as Le Roman d'un trader, which was inspired by the life of Jérôme Kerviel. Aided by director , he presented the latter play with Lorànt Deutsch as the lead actor. The piece was adapted into cinema by Christophe Barratier with Arthur Dupont in the role of Jérôme Kerviel.

Jean-Louis Bauer died in Paris on 30 September 2022 at the age of 70.

Filmography

Cinema
 (1983)
Contes clandestins (1985)
Le Contretemps (2009)

Television
 (1974)
 (1978)
Médecins de nuit (1978)
 (1981)
La Vie telle qu'elle change (1984)

References

1952 births
2022 deaths
20th-century French male actors
21st-century French male actors
Male actors from Paris